The 2019 Mountain West Conference baseball tournament took place from May 23 through 26.  The top four of the league's seven teams met in the double-elimination tournament held at William Peccole Park in Reno, Nevada.  The winner of the tournament, Fresno State, earned the Mountain West Conference's automatic bid to the 2019 NCAA Division I baseball tournament.

Format and seeding
The conference's top four teams were seeded based on winning percentage during the round robin regular season schedule.  They then played a double-elimination tournament with the top seed playing the fourth seeded team and the second seeded team playing the third seed.

Bracket

Conference championship

References

Tournament
Mountain West Conference baseball tournament
Mountain West Conference baseball tournament
Mountain West Conference baseball tournament
College baseball tournaments in Nevada
Sports competitions in Reno, Nevada